Avdey Stepanovich  Ter-Oganyan (born December 9, 1961, Rostov-on-Don) is a Russian painter, one of the prominent representatives of the .

He is famous for extravagant and sometimes provocative art actions. His practice includes installations and performances.

In the ranking of the magazine ArtChronika  50 most influential people in Russian art 2010  Avdey Ter-Oganyan took 23rd place.

He currently lives and works in Prague.

References

External links
 Живой журнал А. Тер-Оганьяна
 Досье А. Тер-Оганьяна в Арт-Азбуке GiF.Ru
 Zone - Eastern Europe ZONE 2
 Performance Festival The Second Edition, Timişoara, 11–13 October 1996

1961 births
Living people
Artists from Rostov-on-Don
Russian contemporary artists
Censorship in the arts
20th-century Russian painters
21st-century Russian painters